The Arcuș is a right tributary of the river Olt in Romania. It discharges into the Olt near the city Sfântu Gheorghe.

References

Rivers of Romania
Rivers of Covasna County